The TREMEC T-5 is a 5-speed manual transmission for longitudinal engine automobiles.  It includes one overdrive gear, a lightweight aluminum housing, and adaptability for four wheel drive use.  It is currently manufactured by TREMEC.

History and design
The T-5 was originally designed by BorgWarner based on the T-4 and earlier SR4, and was sold as the BorgWarner T-5 until the design was sold to TTC (aka Tremec) in the late 1990s. The SR4 was a light-duty 4-speed manual that used ball and needle bearings on the countershaft with bronze synchronizer rings. The T4 improved this design with tapered roller bearings on the input and output shafts and a straight roller bearing on the counter gear. The T-5 is a T4 with an added overdrive gear. The T-5 carries a part number of 1352-000-xxx, where xxx is a three-digit application-specific number ranging from 001 to 260 that also can be used to distinguish World Class from Standard T-5 transmissions.

The first T-5s were installed in the AMC Spirit/Concord. In 1982, GM began fitting the T-5 to the S-10/S-15 compact pickup trucks; then in 1983, both Ford (Mustang) and GM (Camaro/Firebird) picked up the T-5 for their pony cars.

The T-5 has become a popular restomod option for older and classic manual transmission cars, as the overdrive gear can improve fuel economy. In general, retrofitting the T-5 is straightforward for many rear-drive Fords from the 1960s and 1970s, as they are dimensionally compatible.

Models

The T-5 is available in "World Class" (WC) and "Standard" (STD) models; STD are sometimes known as Non-World Class (NWC). Compared to the Standard, the WC changes bearing types and blocker ring materials. Externally, the tapered roller bearing race for the countershaft at the front of the WC, facing the clutch and below the input shaft, can be distinguished from the corresponding straight roller bearing cup of the STD. If this is not visually accessible, the color of the synchronizer rings can be used to distinguish the two types, with the oil fill plug removed. WC transmissions should be filled with automatic transmission fluid, while STD models use 50W gear oil.

Typical first gear ratios for the WC ranged from 3.35 to 3.97:1; the Ford Mustang SVO had a unique 3.50:1 first gear for 1986.

Applications

 1982-83 AMC Spirit
 1982-83 AMC Concord
 1982-88 AMC Eagle
 1982-86 Jeep CJ-7
 1984-86 2.5L Inline 4, 2.8L V6, and turbo diesel Jeep Cherokee XJ/Comanche MJ
 1984-86 Ford Mustang SVO (World-Class T-5 1985-1986)
 1983.5-1995 V8 Ford Mustang (World-Class T-5 1985-1995)
 1983.5-1986 V8 Mercury Capri (World-Class T-5 1985-1986)
 1994-2010 V6 Ford Mustang
 1983-1993 Inline-4 Ford Mustang
 1983-1986 Inline-4 Mercury Capri
 1983-1988 Ford Thunderbird Turbo Coupe and Mercury Cougar XR-7
 1986-2004 Ford Falcon
 1985-1987 Ford Sierra RS Cosworth
 1988 Ford Sierra RS500 Cosworth
 1988-1989 Ford Sierra Cosworth Sapphire 2wd
 Chevrolet S-10 Blazer
 1983-1992 Chevrolet Camaro (Non-World-Class T-5 to 1987 and World Class from 1988 - 1992with RPO code MK6)
 1993-2002 Chevrolet Camaro (V6 models World-Class)
 1986-1989 Chevrolet Astro
 1986-1989 GMC Safari
 1993-1995 Chevrolet S-10
 1982-1983 (Datsun) Nissan 280ZX Turbo
 1984-1986 Nissan 300ZX Turbo
 1989-1995 Holden Commodore VN - VS S1
 Panther Solo 2
 1983-1992 Pontiac Firebird (Non-World-Class T-5 to 1987 and World Class from 1988 - 1992 with RPO code MK6)
 1993-2002 Pontiac Firebird (V6 models World-Class)
 2004-2010 Mustang V6 4.0L
 Ssangyong Musso
 Ssangyong Korando
 TVR Griffith 500
 TVR Chimaera 500
 TVR Cerbera
 TVR Tuscan with the option of a close ratio gearset on 1st, 2nd & 3rd gears for the Tuscan S
 TVR T350
 TVR Tamora
 TVR Sagaris with the option of the close ratio gearset used in the Tuscan S

References

External links
 
 

5
5
General Motors transmissions